Otto Bolden (July 22, 1879 – February 17, 1930) was an American Negro league catcher between 1909 and 1912.

Career
A native of Waco, Texas, Bolden made his Negro leagues debut in 1909 with the San Antonio Black Bronchos. He went on to play for the Los Angeles Trilbys, Oklahoma Monarchs, Kansas City Giants, and Kansas City Royal Giants.

On August 31, 1910, Bolden married Lucy Johnson, sister of boxer Jack Johnson, in Chicago.

Bolden died in Kansas City, Missouri in 1930 at age 50.

References

External links
Baseball statistics and player information from Baseball-Reference Black Baseball Stats and Seamheads

1879 births
1930 deaths
Kansas City Giants players
Kansas City Royal Giants players
Oklahoma Monarchs players
San Antonio Black Bronchos players